Volleyball at the 2021 Southeast Asian Games took place in Quảng Ninh, Vietnam from 13 to 22 May 2022. The 2021 Games featured competitions in four events. The indoor volleyball competition took place at Đại Yên Arena, and the beach volleyball competitions were held at Tuần Châu Resort. All events were free-entry for spectators.

Medal table

Participating nations

Competition schedule
Indoor volleyball events were held from 13 to 22 May 2022, while beach volleyball events were held from 15 to 21 May 2022.

The following was the competition schedule for the indoor volleyball competitions:

Indoor volleyball

Men's tournament

The tournament featured 7 countries. The format was the same as 2019; there will be a group of three or four teams with round-robin format each. The top two of each group will play in the semifinal round. The winners of the semifinal round will play for the gold medal and the losers will play for the bronze medal.

Women's tournament

The tournament featured 5 countries. There will be a group of five teams with round-robin format. The top two of group will play for the gold medal and the third and fourth place of group will play for the bronze medal.

Beach volleyball

Men's tournament

The tournament featured 8 countries separated into 2 Pools with round robin format. Each country has 2 pairs of players playing in a best of 3 set match. The top two of group played in the semifinal round. The winners of the semifinal round played for the gold medal and the losers played for the bronze.

Women's tournament

The tournament featured 6 countries. There was a group of six team with round-robin format. The top two of group played for the gold medal and the third and fourth place of group played for the bronze medal.

Medalists

References

S
 
2021
Southeast Asian Games
2021 Southeast Asian Games events
International volleyball competitions hosted by Vietnam